is a railway station in Aka, Fukuoka Prefecture, Japan. It is on the Tagawa Line, operated by the Heisei Chikuhō Railway. Trains arrive roughly every 30 minutes.

This station is the intersection between the Tagawa Line and the incomplete . The town of Aka currently operates a seasonal electric train on a short segment of the track for tourism.

External links
Aka Station (Heisei Chikuhō Railway website)

References

Railway stations in Fukuoka Prefecture
Railway stations in Japan opened in 2003
Heisei Chikuhō Railway Tagawa Line